Mostapha Mahdavi is an Iranian footballer who plays for Aluminium Hormozgan in the Azadegan League.

Club career
Mahdvi joined Naft Tehran in 2011, after playing the previous two seasons at Sepahan Novin and Foolad Natanz in the Azadegan League.

Club career statistics

 Assists

References

Living people
Naft Tehran F.C. players
Sepahan Novin players
Foolad Natanz players
Iranian footballers
Association football midfielders
Year of birth missing (living people)